Columbus Park formerly known as Mulberry Bend Park, Five Points Park and Paradise Park, is a public park in Chinatown, Manhattan, in New York City that was built in 1897. During the 19th century, this was the most dangerous ghetto area of immigrant New York, as portrayed in the book and film Gangs of New York. Back then, the park's site was part of the Five Points neighborhood, in the area known as Mulberry Bend, hence its alternative names. It was renamed Columbus Park in 1911, in honor of Christopher Columbus. Today, the park often serves as a gathering place for the local Chinese community, where "the neighborhood meets up here to play mahjong, perform traditional Chinese music... [and] practice tai chi in the early mornings."

In 2019, a statue of Dr. Sun Yat-sen by Lu Chun-Hsiung and Michael Kang was permanently installed in the northern plaza of the park. The plaza was also renamed for the founder of the first Republic of China, who lived in Manhattan's Chinatown for a time.

In October 2021, a large-scale crochet mural made of over 1,500 flowers was put up on the fences of Columbus Park by Chinatown Yarn Circle and Think!Chinatown.

See also
 1982 garment workers' strike
 Chinese Americans in New York City

References

External links
 

Chinatown, Manhattan
Five Points, Manhattan
Parks in Manhattan